Guild's Lake (also Guild Lake) was a flood-prone lowland near the confluence of Balch Creek with the Willamette River in the U.S. state of Oregon. Indigenous Multnomah people established villages on nearby Sauvie Island but not in the swampy area along the Balch Creek side of the river in what later became northwest Portland.

The lake took its name from Peter Guild (pronounced guile), one of the first 19th-century settlers in the area. After Guild's death in 1870, various landowners modified the area to accommodate sawmills, railroads, shipping docks, and Portland's city garbage incinerator. The Guild's Lake Rail Yard, built by the Northern Pacific Railway in the 1880s, became an important switching yard for trains. Beginning in the 1890s, channel-deepening in the Willamette River improved the city's status as a deep-water seaport, as did completion in 1914 of a port terminal. These developments helped make nearby Guild's Lake the most important industrial area in Portland.

In 1905, the Lewis and Clark Centennial Exposition, held on an artificial island in Guild's Lake, had helped spur growth in the area. After the exposition ended, developers filled the lake and its surrounds with rocks and gravel sluiced from parts of the Balch Creek watershed in the West Hills above the floodplain or dredged from the Willamette River. Civic leaders promoted the Guild's Lake area as a good place for industry, and by the mid-1920s the lake was gone. Instead, it became "a drying and settling mud flat ... awaiting development during World War II". During World War II, the Guild's Lake Housing Project, an adjunct to the Vanport project, provided temporary housing for workers in the nearby Kaiser Shipyards. After the war, chemical and petroleum processing and storage, metals manufacturing, and other large industries expanded in the area. In 2001, the Portland City Council adopted the Guild's Lake Industrial Sanctuary Plan aimed at protecting the area's "long-term economic viability as an industrial district."

See also
 List of lakes in Oregon

References

External links
 Guild's Lake in The Oregon Encyclopedia

History of Portland, Oregon
Lakes of Oregon
Former lakes of the United States
World's fair sites in the United States
Lakes of Multnomah County, Oregon
Lewis and Clark Centennial Exposition